Daleep Singh Parihar (or simply Daleep Parihar) is an Indian leader and a member of the Bharatiya Janata Party. Parihar was a member of the Jammu and Kashmir Legislative Assembly i.e. MLA from the Bhaderwah constituency in Doda district of Jammu and Kashmir, India.

References 

People from Doda district
Bharatiya Janata Party politicians from Jammu and Kashmir
Living people
Jammu and Kashmir MLAs 2014–2018
People from Bhaderwah
Year of birth missing (living people)